Where the Bullets Fly is a 1966 British comedy spy film directed by John Gilling and starring Tom Adams as Charles Vine and John Arnatt reprising their roles from Licensed to Kill. It also stars Dawn Addams, Tim Barrett and Michael Ripper.

Plot
The film begins with a pre-credit sequence in which a group of unnamed terrorists have parked a vehicle containing a guided missile pointed straight at the Palace of Westminster whilst politicians are heard on the film's soundtrack. They are thwarted by a group of older women in a tour group who turn out to be cross-dressing commandos who eliminate the terrorists with sub-machine guns and grenades. They are led by Agent Charles Vine with his second-in-command being Lt. Guy Fawkes who has saved the Parliament of England.

The film proper begins with the Royal Air Force testing a secret light-weight metal called "Spurium"  that enables nuclear aircraft to fly. An unnamed sinister organisation led by a man named Angel hijacks the DC-3 aircraft by hypnotising the RAF Regiment guards and flying the plane to another location but they are shot down by the RAF.

Afraid the incident may happen again, Vine is assigned as security to the project.  However Angel's organisation kidnap Vine and replace him with one of their own men named Seraph. Obtaining information before he escapes allows Seraph to steal a sample of Spurium to be sold to the Soviet Union, but the Russians believe he is double-crossing them and kill him.

Vine escapes and reports to the RAF airbase, where he meets his RAF counterpart, Flight Lieutenant Felicity "Fiz" Moonlight. Angel's men try an all-out assault on the airfield to capture the next nuclear aircraft set to fly. Vine and Angel end up in the nuclear aircraft that takes flight but Vine is rescued by F/L Moonlight.

Cast
 Tom Adams - Charles Vine
 Dawn Addams - Flt Lt Felicity 'Fiz' Moonlight
 Michael Ripper - Angel
 Tim Barrett - Seraph
 Sid James - Mortuary Attendant
 Wilfrid Brambell - Train Guard
 Joe Baker - Minister
 John Arnatt - Rockwell
 Ronald Leigh-Hunt - Thursby
 Marcus Hammond - O'Neil
 Tony Arpino - Butler
 Michael Balfour - Band Leader
 Tom Bowman - Russian Colonel
 Maurice Browning - Cherub
 Michael James Cox - Lt. Guy Fawkes
 Sue Donovan - Celia
 Peter Ducrow - Prof. Harding
 James Ellis - Flight Lt. Fotheringham
 Heidi Erich - Carruthers
 Suzan Farmer - Caron
 Michael Goldie - Labourer
 David Gregory - R.A.F. Sergeant
 Gerard Heinz - Venstram
 John Horsley - Air Marshal
 Charles Houston - Co-pilot
 Patrick Jordan - Russian

Production
The Royal Air Force cooperated with the producers allowing several scenes to be filmed at RAF Biggin Hill.

Different dialogue was substituted for the American release in which the opening parliamentary satire was reduced in length and the word "Biggles" is replaced by "Batman" when Seraph is talking of his excitement at visiting Secret Service headquarters.

Originally, the studio announced the title of this film as The Third Best Secret Agent in the Whole Wide World.

Sequel
A third film in the Charles Vine series, called Somebody's Stolen Our Russian Spy (also known as O.K. Yevtushenko) was produced by James Ward, and written by Michael Pittock. The script was polished and directed by José Luis Madrid, who shot the whole film in Spain rather than United Kingdom where the previous instalments were made. Tom Adams reprised his role as Vine.

References

External links
 

1966 films
British spy comedy films
Films directed by John Gilling
1960s spy comedy films
British aviation films
Embassy Pictures films
British sequel films
1966 comedy films
1960s English-language films
1960s British films